Edward Byron Reuter (July 19, 1881 – May 28, 1946) was an American sociologist and the 23rd President of the American Sociological Association (for the year 1933). His research focused on the field of sociology of race and ethnic relations.

Biography 
Reuter studied social sciences at the University of Missouri. In 1910 he did his bachelor's degree there, and in 1911 his master's degree. For the next three years, he served as the principal of a high school in California. He then continued his sociology studies at the University of Chicago, where he was influenced by Albion Woodbury Small, William Isaac Thomas, Robert Ezra Park, and George Herbert Mead. In 1919 he received his Ph.D. with his dissertation The Mulatto in the United States.

As a professor, Reuter taught at the University of Illinois, Tulane University, the University of Iowa, and finally, from 1944 until his death, succeeding Robert E. Park at Fisk University in Nashville.

In his research, Reuter examined in particular the relationships between biological and sociological phenomena and the relationships between ethnic groups. He served as the President of the American Sociological Association in 1933.

Works 

 Population Problems, 1923 (revised edition in 1937)
 The American Race Problem, 1927 (revised edition in1938)
 Race Mixture, 1931
 Race and Culture Contacts, 1934.

References

External links 

 Bernard's biography at ASA

1881 births
1946 deaths
20th-century American scientists
Presidents of the American Sociological Association
University of Chicago alumni
Fisk University faculty
University of Iowa faculty
Tulane University faculty
University of Illinois Chicago faculty